The McIntyre Building is a historic commercial building in downtown Salt Lake City, Utah, United States, that is listed on the National Register of Historic Places (NRHP).

Description
The building is located at 68-72 South Main Street and was designed by architect Richard K.A. Kletting in Sullivanesque style.

It has been said to be "the earliest and best example of Sullivanesque architecture in the state" (besides the Dooly Building, demolished, designed by Louis Sullivan himself).

It was believed to be the "first all reinforced concrete and fireproof building west of the Mississippi River" when it was completed in 1909.

It was originally I-shaped in plan, and this has only been modified minimally.  It has clerestory windows over its main stairway.

The building was listed on the NRHP July 15, 1977.

See also

 National Register of Historic Places listings in Salt Lake City
 McCornick Building, adjacent, also NRHP-listed.

References

External links

National Register of Historic Places in Salt Lake City
Late 19th and Early 20th Century American Movements architecture
Buildings and structures completed in 1909